Gas Food Lodging is a 1992 American drama film written and directed by Allison Anders and starring Brooke Adams, Ione Skye, and Fairuza Balk. It tells the story of a waitress trying to find romance while raising two daughters in a trailer park in a small desert town in New Mexico. It was adapted from the young adult novel Don't Look and It Won't Hurt by Richard Peck.

The film was produced by Cineville and entered into the 42nd Berlin International Film Festival. Fairuza Balk won the 1993 Independent Spirit Award for best female lead for her role.

Plot
Nora, a waitress with two teenage daughters, struggles to raise them in a trailer park as a single parent after her husband abandons the family. After repeatedly skipping school to go on dates, Trudi, the elder daughter, quits school and gets a job as a waitress alongside her mother. Meanwhile, the younger daughter, Shade, spends most of her time watching the movies of Mexican film star Elvia Rivero and dreams of finding a boyfriend for her mother.

After being dumped by the boy she was seeing, Trudi meets Dank, a British petrologist, at the restaurant where she's working. They eventually sleep together, and she tells him that her promiscuity is caused by the fact that she lost her virginity in a gang rape perpetrated by local boys she knew. Returning home the following night, her mother tells her that she has one month to find a new home.

Shade tries to seduce Darius, her friend, by dressing up in a wig and costume à la Olivia Newton-John, Darius's supposed dream girl, at her sister's suggestion. After her seduction attempt fails, presumably because he is gay, she runs into Javier, the local projectionist, who teases her over her outfit before giving her a ride home on his bike. Afterwards she sets her mother up on a date with Raymond, a married man who was revealed earlier in the film to be having an intermittent affair with her mother. As they do not want to reveal their connection to the eavesdropping Shade, they make wry conversation where Raymond claims to work as a gravedigger and Nora as a brain surgeon.

Trudi discovers she is pregnant with Dank's child, but when he fails to return from an expedition, decides to go to Dallas and give up her child for adoption rather than have an abortion. While Trudi is away, Nora begins an affair with Hamlet Humphrey, a man who installs satellite dishes, while the girls' biological father, John, reappears.

Shade falls in love with Javier and tries to reconnect with her father. Initially disturbed by Hamlet Humphrey, she warms to him after he reveals that he is familiar with the movies of Elvia Rivero and compares Nora to her.

Shade goes to Dallas with her mother and Hamlet for the birth of Trudi's baby. After giving birth to a daughter, Trudi tells Shade that she'll be staying in the city, as their home holds too many bad memories for her. On their way home, Shade spots a sign advertising day-glo rocks like the one Dank gave her sister. She goes to confront Dank but instead learns that he was killed in an accident while looking for rocks. Walking off into the desert, Shade realizes that Dank always loved Trudi and vows to eventually tell her what happened.

Cast

 Brooke Adams as Nora
 Ione Skye as Trudi
 Fairuza Balk as Shade
 Robert Knepper as Dank
 David Lansbury as Hamlet (David Landsbury)
 Chris Mulkey as Raymond
 Donovan Leitch as Darius
 Julie Condra as Tanya
 Jacob Vargas as Javier
 Laurie O'Brien as Thelma
 Adam Biesk as Brett
 James Brolin as John Evans
 J Mascis as Cecil

In addition, Adams' daughter, Josie Lynne, appears as Trudi at 2 years; Skye and Leitch are real life siblings.

Soundtrack 
The soundtrack for Gas Food Lodging was released by Elektra Records containing 28 tracks. J. Mascis of Dinosaur Jr. contributed many of the tracks and also made a cameo at the end of the film, as the guy who explains what happened to Dank.

Reception 
Hal Hinson of The Washington Post wrote that "It's a great movie about making do."

Janet Maslin of The New York Times wrote that "there are subtly etched characters, effortlessly fine performances, and a moving story that is not easily forgotten."

On Rotten Tomatoes, the film has an approval rating of 81% based on 16 reviews.

Home media 
Gas Food Lodging was released on DVD region 1 in the United States and Canada on September 23, 2003 via Sony Pictures Home Entertainment It was again made available in region 1 as part of the Sony Choice Collection on April 3, 2012.

The film was made available for the first time on Blu-ray format in the U.S. and Canada via the Sony Choice Collection on April 4, 2017. The set contains the 1080p transfer, 2.0 DTS-HD Master Audio and English SDH subtitles and no special features.

In November 2018, the Arrow Films subsidiary, Arrow Academy, released a special edition Blu-ray of the film featuring a remastered 1080p transfer and the original uncompressed 2.0 audio, as well as several new special features.

See also
 List of films featuring the deaf and hard of hearing

References

External links
 
 

1992 films
1992 drama films
1990s feminist films
American independent films
Films set in New Mexico
Films shot in New Mexico
Films based on American novels
Films directed by Allison Anders
American drama films
American feminist films
1992 independent films
Films about mother–daughter relationships
Films about sisters
1990s American films